Skullbones Creek or Skullbone Creek is a stream in Jefferson County in the U.S. state of Missouri. It is a tributary of Big River.

The confluence with Big River is adjacent to Missouri Route 30 just southeast of Cedar Hill.

Tradition has it a human skull was found along the course of Skullbones Creek, which accounts for the name.

See also
List of rivers of Missouri

References

Rivers of Jefferson County, Missouri
Rivers of Missouri